Anairis Quiñones (born September 16, 1997) is an American voice actress. After watching several anime dubs as a child, Quiñones was inspired to pursue a career in voice acting, which she began in 2009. Some of her noteworthy roles include Miyuki Shiba in The Irregular at Magic High School, Echidna in Re:Zero − Starting Life in Another World, Rika Kawai in Wonder Egg Priority, and Nessa in Pokémon: Twilight Wings.

Biography
Quiñones was born in Florida on September 16, 1997. Growing up, Quiñones was a fan of the Pokémon and Yu-Gi-Oh! series. However, what inspired her to pursue a career in voice acting was the English dub of Fullmetal Alchemist, specifically the performance by Laura Bailey as Lust. Quiñones started voice acting in 2009 and booked her first anime role in 2018 in Kemono Friends.

Filmography

Anime

Films

Video games

Animation

Awards

References

External links
 
 

1997 births
Living people
Actresses from Florida
Actresses from Los Angeles
American video game actresses
American voice actresses
People from Los Angeles
21st-century African-American people
21st-century American actresses
American people of Panamanian descent
American people of Puerto Rican descent
21st-century LGBT people
LGBT African Americans
LGBT people from Florida
LGBT people from California
Bisexual actresses